A number of steamships were named Grete, including –

, built by N P Petersen, Thurö
, built by Russell & Co, Port Glasgow
, built by Skiens Verksted, Skien
, built by Neptun AG, Rostock
, built by Helsingfors Jernskæg & Maskinen, Elsinore

Ship names